Tina Moewai Bell-Kake (born 30 June 1967 in Taumarunui) is a former field hockey midfielder from New Zealand, who finished sixth with her national team at the 2000 Summer Olympics in Sydney. Bell-Kake also competed with The Black Sticks at the 1992 Summer Olympics in Barcelona, and won a bronze medal at the 1998 Commonwealth Games in Kuala Lumpur.

References

External links
 

1967 births
Living people
New Zealand female field hockey players
Olympic field hockey players of New Zealand
Field hockey players at the 1992 Summer Olympics
Field hockey players at the 1998 Commonwealth Games
Field hockey players at the 2000 Summer Olympics
Commonwealth Games bronze medallists for New Zealand
Commonwealth Games medallists in field hockey
20th-century New Zealand women
21st-century New Zealand women
Medallists at the 1998 Commonwealth Games